The Prior of Fogo was the head of the Tironensian monastic community and lands of Fogo Priory, Roxburghshire, founded sometime between 1253 and 1297. The patron was a local landlord named Patrick Corbet, who granted lands to Kelso Abbey to establish a cell there. Although almost none of the priors are known, the following two are recorded:

 William Leischmann, 1465-1466
 Andrew Leslie, 1537

Bibliography
 Cowan, Ian B. & Easson, David E., Medieval Religious Houses: Scotland With an Appendix on the Houses in the Isle of Man, Second edition, (London, 1976), p. 67
 Watt, D. E. R. & Shead, N. F. (eds.), The Heads of Religious Houses in Scotland from the 12th to the 16th Centuries, The Scottish Records Society, New Series, Volume 24, (Edinburgh, 2001), p. 83

See also
 Abbot of Kelso
 Fogo Priory
Fogo, Scottish Borders

People associated with the Scottish Borders
Fogo
Fogo